Challenge to White Fang is a 1974 Northern film. A sequel to White Fang, it was directed, as was its predecessor, by Lucio Fulci, as part of a trend of films inspired by Call of the Wild (1972), which was a surprise hit in Italy. Two German productions in this trend were Hellhounds of Alaska and Cry of the Black Wolves, both directed by Harald Reinl.

Plot

Set in the Yukon, Canada in 1899 around three years after the conclusion of the previous film, Mitsha (Missaele) (the young boy from the first White Fang movie), is now a pre-teenager working with his wolf-dog and two fur traders when Beauty Smith (John Steiner) and two henchmen appear and raid the traders camp shooting and killing all of them, including Mitsha, and escapes in a canoe with all their equipment. Several hours later, the wolf-dog is found by John Tarwater (Harry Carey Jr.) a grizzled old trader who buries the dead Mitsha, and takes the hound back to a nearby town which is his home. The wolf-dog befriends another young boy who is John's orphaned, 10-year-old grandson Bill Tarwater (Renato Cestle). After looking for a name, Bill gives White Fang his name by yet again from the beasts ivory-white teeth. At a local saloon, White Fang helps John Tarwater win some money at a card game from a crooked card-shark, and a fistfight breaks out between the swindler and his victims as John casually counts his money, while White Fang and Bill take cover behind the bar. John then embarks on one of his periodic expeditions to discover gold.

Meanwhile, Beauty Smith is alive and well, and again exploiting the people of the very town where John and Bill live. Smith lives under the alias 'Charles Forth', a local businessman, and fakes a crippling injury by confining himself to a wheelchair with his two henchman always at his side. Sister Evangelina (Virna Lisi) is now running a new mission hut in the town to convert into a hospital. She decides to ask 'Mr. Forth' for funding to operate her hospital despite warnings from the townsmen that 'Mr. Forth' is a businessman and won't give her any money unless she gives him assurances that she will repay the loan, with interest, within 60 days or less. Sister Evangelina nevertheless goes to meet with him, and she recognizes the villainous man immediately.

Sister Evangelina contacts novelist Jason Scott (Franco Nero) who's on a book tour down south and agrees to come to her assistance. Scott also meets with his old friend Kurt Johnson (Raimund Harmstorf), now working as a mines inspector to help out. Together, the three of them take their accusations to the town's police chief, Inspector Leclerq (Renato de Carmine), who is actually on the payroll of Beauty Smith and he claims to have known the crippled 'Mr. Forth' for six years. Leclerq's wife Jane (Hannelore Elsner), is pressuring her husband to accommodate Smith's nefarious plans in return for more bribe money he gives them in exchange for protection.

Jason Scott attempts to expose the illegal complicity between 'Mr. Forth' and the Inspector with the help of a local worker named Liverpool (Donald O'Brien), who agrees to write a statement in exchange for money. But Liverpool goes back on his word to help Scott by skipping down with the money that was given to him. Shortly afterwards, Scott encounters Bill and John Tarwater when White Fang drags them back to town after their sled dogs had run away leaving them stranded on a snowy plain. The animal shows both affection for both Bill and Scott having remembered the latter from their previous adventure in Dawson City three years earlier. Elsewhere, Kurt meets Liverpool's younger and attractive sister (Yanti Somer) and a romantic attraction develops between both of them.

The following day, Liverpool shamefacedly returns to the town having found two men, one dead and the other terribly ill from frostbite, who have been sold insufficient and overpriced supplies from Beauty Smith. The survivor, named Carter, has gangrene in both legs and Scott has to help Sister Evangelina perform the amputation at the mission hut. When Beauty Smith and his henchmen see and recognize White Fang, they frame the wolf-dog for savaging Liverpool to death. An enraged posse attempts to kill White Fang, forcing Bill to drive the beast out of town.

The next day, when Bill looks for White Fang in the woods, he gets attacked by a vicious eagle, but White Fang jumps in and saves him by fighting off the eagle. Bill smuggles White Fang back into town and to Sister Evangelina's mission where the wolf-dog's injuries are tended. While visiting his grandson and his hound at the mission, John learns from Carter about the location of a gold-stream in the mountains that he found. But Harvey (Werner Pochath), a mission employee and a secret associate of Beauty Smith, sees them discussing the location and reports it to his boss. Jane then fakes a sickness to lure Sister Evangelina away from the mission, leaving Carter alone in his sickbed. Beauty Smith (no longer pretending to be crippled) pays a visit and tortures Carter for the location of the gold stream. Smith then kidnaps John Tarwater and has his two henchmen set fire to the mission hut. Carter is burned to death, while Bill, who walked in while Smith was torturing Carter, is trapped by the flames. When Sister Evangelina realizes that Jane is not sick, she races back to the burning mission and rushes in saving Bill, but gets caught on fire and dies from the severity of her burns.

Hearing of her death, the townspeople start a riot after learning from Bill about the wanted Beauty Smith and of Inspector Leclerq's association with him. As the mob breaks through the Mounties into the police station, Leclerq shoots himself. Scott, Kurt, and Bill find Jane where she tells them where Beauty Smith is heading. Scott and Kurt, with White Fang in tow, organize a posse to give chase. Locating Smith and his henchmen, Scott leads the posse forward and a gun battle develops. Smith manages to shoot a few posse members, while his two henchmen are killed. White Fang catches up to Smith and attacks him. Smith's gunshots miss the beast and instead triggers an avalanche. The villain finally dies as he gets crushed to death under the falling snow and ice. Shortly afterwards, Scott, Kurt, and White Fang locate John Tarwater who was shot and left for dead. But before he dies, he asks Scott that his grandson be the beneficiary of the gold stream that he found right near him with Carter's advice. The two-faced Harvey suddenly shows his true colors and says that the owner will legally be the first one to register the claim in the town. He suggests a dog-sled race to settle the disputed claim.

In the climatic sled race, Harvey attempts dirty tricks to win the race, but the tables turn on him when he falls from his sled and dies when he gets accidentally run over by the sled-team headed by White Fang. Scott and White Fang arrive in the town first, and the writer enters Bill Tarwater's name in the ledger in place of his own.

In the final scene, Jason Scott says his goodbyes to Kurt who will be staying in the town having gotten the job as the new police inspector, and he announces that he and Liverpool's sister will be getting married in the spring. Bill also stays to live with Kurt and his wife who have agreed to raise the boy and White Fang. Scott then returns to Vancouver with new stories to write, while White Fang is torn between running after him or staying with Bill. However, the wolf-dog chooses to stay with his young master as he runs back to Bill.

Cast 
Franco Nero as Jason Scott
 Virna Lisi as Sister Evangelina
 John Steiner as Charles 'Beauty' Smith
 Raimund Harmstorf as  Kurt Jansen
 Yanti Somer as Liverpool's Sister
 Harry Carey Jr. as  John Tarwater
 Renato Cestiè as  Bill Tarwater
 Werner Pochath as  Harvey
 Hannelore Elsner as  Jane LeClerq
 Renato De Carmine as  Lt. Charles LeClerq
 John Bartha as  Mountie

Release
Challenge to White Fang was released in Italy on October 25, 1974.

References

Footnotes

Sources

External links

1974 films
Italian adventure films
1970s adventure films
Films about dogs
Films about wolves
Films based on White Fang
Films scored by Carlo Rustichelli
Northern (genre) films
1970s Italian-language films
1970s Italian films